Arthur Carr may refer to:

Arthur Carr, author of the volume on the Gospel of Matthew in the Cambridge Bible for Schools and Colleges series
Arthur Comyns Carr (1882–1965), British Liberal politician and lawyer
Arthur Carr (cricketer) (1893–1963), English cricketer
Arthur Carr (equestrian) (1910–1986), British equestrian
Arthur Wesley Carr (1941–2017), Anglican divine, Dean of Westminster, 1997–2006